J: Beyond Flamenco is a 2016 Spanish musical film directed by Carlos Saura. It was selected to be screened in the Masters section at the 2016 Toronto International Film Festival.

The film's premiere in Spain was in Zaragoza on October 3, 2016, with the presence of the director, Carlos Saura, the producers, César Alierta (Telefonica / Movistar) and Leslie Calvo (Tres Monstruos Media) and the main artists: Juan Manuel Cañizares (guitar), Carlos Núñez (bagpiper), Miguel Angel Berna (dancer),  Manuela Adamo (dancer) and Nacho del Río (singer).

Cast
 Ara Malikian 
 Carlos Núñez 
 Sara Baras
 Juan Manuel Cañizares
 Miguel Ángel Berna
 Nacho del Río
 Beatriz Bernad
 Francesco Loccisano
 Giovanni Sollima
 Manuela Adamo

References

External links
 
 Video Official Trailer.
 Official Web.

2016 films
Spanish documentary films
Films directed by Carlos Saura
2010s Spanish films
2010s Spanish-language films